Kathryn Elizabeth Minner (January 3, 1892 – May 26, 1969), sometimes credited as Katherine Minner, was an American character actress who specialized in playing "little old ladies" in movies, on various television shows, and in a series of television commercials for Southern California Dodge dealers.

Biography

Wife and mother
Born Kathryn Elizabeth White in New York City to William H. White and his wife Mary, she married Samuel Stephen Minner on June 17, 1914, in Newark, New Jersey. They initially settled in Kearny, New Jersey, where their first son, Samuel Raymond (known as "Raymond"), was born on June 15, 1915. The Minners soon moved to Flemington, New Jersey, where they had two more children, a daughter, Rita Virginia, born on March 14, 1918, and a son, William James born on April 25, 1919. They remained in Flemington until they moved to California in the mid-1950s to be closer to their son Raymond, who had taken a job with Prudential Insurance Company and was transferred to Los Angeles.

Acting career
Making her first acting appearance at the age of 65 in a 1957 episode of Dragnet, Minner was best known for her appearances in a series of ten television commercials for Chrysler Corporation's Dodge Division which aired in Southern California from 1964 to 1969, and as the red shawl wearing little old lady on the cover of the 1964 Jan and Dean album The Little Old Lady from Pasadena.

In the spring of 1964, Minner came to the attention of the Kohner Agency in Hollywood after she answered a casting call wearing a red shawl, black gloves, and a pair of Keds sneakers.  She was perfect for the part of the "little old lady", which would be featured in a series of upcoming television commercials for Southern California Dodge dealers, and was hired on the spot. The television commercials became one of the most memorable advertising campaigns of the 1960s. Her famous tag line in that Clio Award winning advertising campaign was "Put a Dodge in your garage, honey!"  Minner became a Southern California celebrity for teens, parents, and even bikers. She even made an appearance on The Dating Game, which became their highest rated show.

Death
Kathryn's husband of almost 53 years, Sam Minner, died in January 1967 at the age of 80, and a little more than two years later, on May 26, 1969, Kathryn died of a heart attack in Van Nuys, California at the age of 77. Kathryn was buried next to her husband at the San Fernando Mission Cemetery in the Mission Hills community of Los Angeles, California.

Filmography

References

External links

1892 births
1969 deaths
20th-century American actresses
People from Flemington, New Jersey
People from Kearny, New Jersey
People from New York City
Actresses from Newark, New Jersey
Actresses from California
1964 in music
American television actresses
Advertising characters
Female characters in advertising
Actresses from New York City
Burials at San Fernando Mission Cemetery
Dodge